2000 in Russian football saw the eighth title for FC Spartak Moscow and the third Cup for FC Lokomotiv Moscow.  The national team began qualification for the 2002 FIFA World Cup.

National team 
Russia national football team began qualification for the 2002 FIFA World Cup.

 Russia score given first

Key
 H = Home match
 A = Away match
 F = Friendly
 WCQ = 2002 FIFA World Cup qualifying, UEFA Group 1

Leagues

Top Division

First Division

Sokol and Torpedo-ZIL were promoted to the Top Division for the first time after occupying two top positions in the First Division.

Andrey Fedkov of Sokol became the top goalscorer with 26 goals.

Second Division
Of six clubs that finished first in their respective Second Division zones, three play-off winners were promoted to the First Division:

However, later Severstal refused promotion, and their place was taken by Khimki.

Cup
The Russian Cup was won by Lokomotiv Moscow, who beat CSKA Moscow 3–2 after extra time.

UEFA club competitions

UEFA Cup 1999–2000
Spartak Moscow played in the third round of the 1999–2000 UEFA Cup, where they lost to Leeds United A.F.C. on away goals.

UEFA Intertoto Cup 2000
Zenit Saint Petersburg reached the final of the UEFA Intertoto Cup 2000 after eliminating NK Primorje, Tatabánya FC, and Bradford City A.F.C.  In the final, Zenit lost 3–4 on aggregate to Celta de Vigo.

UEFA Champions League 2000-01
Lokomotiv Moscow failed to qualify for the group stage of the 2000–01 UEFA Champions League, losing 1–6 on aggregate to Beşiktaş J.K. in the third qualifying round.

Spartak Moscow, who qualified for the group stage automatically, finished in the second position, one point behind Real Madrid in Group A which also contained Bayer Leverkusen and Sporting Clube de Portugal.

UEFA Cup 2000-01
Of the four Russian clubs which played in the 2000–01 UEFA Cup, only Lokomotiv Moscow qualified for the second round. Torpedo Moscow lost 2–5 on aggregate to Lausanne Sports, CSKA Moscow 0–1 to Viborg FF (after extra time), and Spartak Vladikavkaz 0–5 to Amica Wronki.

Lokomotiv overcome PFC Naftex Burgas in the first round and FK Inter Bratislava in the second round, qualifying for the spring phase of the UEFA Cup.

References
National team fixtures 
League and cup results
UEFA Champions League results
UEFA Cup results: 1999–2000 2000–01
UEFA Intertoto Cup results

 
Seasons in Russian football